Mount Williams may refer to:

Mountain summit
Mount Williams (Alaska), United States,
Mount Williams (British Columbia), Canada, a mountain in the Bendor Range of the Pacific Ranges of the Coast Mountains, British Columbia, Canada
Mount Williams (California), United States,
Mount Williams (Canada), a mountain on the Continental Divide and British Columbia-Alberta border in the Canadian Rockies
Mount Williams (Massachusetts), United States, a subordinate peak of Mount Greylock, of Massachusetts
Mount Williams, New Zealand, a 2538-metre mountain in the Southern Alps (New Zealand)
Mount Williams (Texas), United States,
Mount Williamson, Inyo County, California, United States
Mount Williamson (Los Angeles County, California), United States

Town
Mount Williams, Virginia, a town in Virginia

Other
Mount Williams (Oklahoma), a demolished hill in Norman, Oklahoma

See also
Williams Mountain (disambiguation)